Football Club Köpetdag is a Turkmen professional football club based in Ashgabat, currently playing in the Ýokary Liga. Their home stadium is Köpetdag Stadium which can hold 26,000 people. Köpetdag traditional kit colours are blue and white. Having won 6 Turkmen championships and 6 Cup of Turkmenistan, they are one of the country's most successful clubs.

History

USSR 
The club participated in 44 of the USSR championships (1947–54, 1956–91). They appeared under the names of Locomotiv (1947–49), Spartak (1950–54), Kolhozchi (1956–59, 1976–87), Stroitel (1962–75) and Köpetdag (1960, 1961, 1988–91, present).

 Soviet League Second group (1947–49), the best place: 3rd in 1948
 Soviet League Class B (1950–54, 1956–63), the best place: 2nd in 1963
 Soviet League Class A, the second group (1964–69), the best place: 4th in 1967
 Soviet First League (1970–74, 1976–79), the best place: 9th in 1976
 Soviet Second League (1975, 1980–91), the best place: 2nd in 1975 and 1991.

In Soviet times, one of the coaches of the team in the 1980s was Valery Nepomnyashchy.

Turkmenistan
After the collapse of the Soviet Union team planned to participate in the open championship of the CIS, but because of the many differences the championship did not take place. The first few years team has been the basic club of Turkmenistan national football team.

In 2008 they were disbanded due to financial crisis, returning few years later.

New era
In 2015, on the basis of MIA of Turkmenistan the club FC Kopetdag was re-created. Club began to make appearances in the First League of Turkmenistan. The team qualified for 2015 Turkmenistan Cup.
They managed promotion to the 2016 season by winning the promotion play-off.

Domestic history

Continental history

Commonwealth of Independent States Cup

1993: Group stage
1994: Semi-final
1995: Group stage
1994: Group stage
1997: Semi-final
1998: Semi-final
1999: Group stage
2001: Semi-final

Honours
 Ýokary Liga
 Champions (6): 1992, 1993, 1994, 1995, 1998, 2000
 Birinji liga
 Champions (1): 2015
 Turkmenistan Cup
 Winners (7): 1993, 1994, 1997, 1999, 2000, 2001, 2018
 Runners-up (4): 1995, 2005, 2006, 2020
 SSR Turkmenistan Cup
 Winners (1): 1992
 Turkmenistan Super Cup
 Runners-up (1): 2019

Coaches

 Alexei Sokolov (1950–51)
 Leo Olshansky (1952–53)
 Stepan Arutyunov (1957)
 Vladimir Alyakrinsky (1964)
 Vladimir Eremeev (1965–66)
 Sergei Budagov (1967–68)
 Holodkov Seraphim (1969)
 Sergei Korshunov (June 1970)
 Sergei Budagov (1971)
 Vladimir Yulygin (1973–74)

 Viktor Kuznetsov (1975–78)
 Anatoli Polosin (1979, until June 11)
 Valery Nepomnyashchy (June 11, 1979, 1982–83)
 Edward Danilov (1984)
 Arsen Naydyonov (1985)
 Vladimir Yulygin (1986)
 Viktor Kuznetsov (1987)
 Vladislav Kazakov (1988)
 Victor Orlov (1989)
 Baýram Durdyýew (1990–96)

 Boris Lavrov (1997–98)
 Tachmurad Agamuradov (July 1998)
 Viktor Pozhechevskyi (July 1998–Jan 1999)
 Ravil Menzeleev – Sergei Kazankov (1999)
 Tachmurad Agamuradov (2000–01)
 Baýram Durdyýew (2001–02)
 Berdymyrat Nurmyradow (2003–07)
 Said Seyidov (2015 – May 2019)
 Çary Annakow (May 2019 – June 2019)
 Tofik Şükürow (June 2019 – present)

References

Football clubs in Turkmenistan
Football clubs in Ashgabat
Association football clubs established in 1947
1947 establishments in the Soviet Union